Choi Yong-soo (born 10 September 1973) is a South Korean professional football manager and former player.

Playing career
Choi played as a striker for Anyang LG Cheetahs (currently FC Seoul) in South Korea's K League. In 2000, he led Anyang to the K League title, receiving the K League MVP Award. He is considered one of the FC Seoul's legends.

Choi also played for the South Korean national team in 1998 and 2002 FIFA World Cup.

Managerial career
Choi was appointed as the assistant coach of FC Seoul in August 2006, and was promoted as the caretaker manager in April 2011. He was finally named a permanent coach after leading Seoul as a caretaker manager during the 2011 season. He led his team to the 2012 K League title and the 2013 AFC Champions League Final. They drew all two matches of the Champions League final against Guangzhou Evergrande, a Chinese club led by Marcello Lippi, but couldn't get the title due to the away goals rule. Nevertheless, Choi was named the AFC Coach of the Year.

On 21 June 2016, he was officially appointed as the manager of a Chinese club Jiangsu Suning. He finished as runner-up in the Chinese Super League and the Chinese FA Cup. On 1 June 2017, he officially resigned from Jiangsu Suning.

On 11 October 2018, Choi was officially reappointed as the manager of FC Seoul, which was being threatened with relegation. On 9 December 2018, Choi won the relegation playoffs against Busan IPark, successfully keeping Seoul in the K League. On 30 July 2020, he resigned from Seoul due to his poor results in the 2020 season.

On 17 November 2021, Choi started to manage Gangwon FC.

Personal life
Choi divorced his wife in November 2006 after a 15-month-long marriage. His former wife, a one-time contestant in a Miss Korea pageant, went through the legal procedures to take half the estate properties under Choi's name per their prenuptial agreement.

In Australia and Pakistan, Choi is known as "Younis Choi", given to him in recognition of his low, swerving shots on goal – much like the signature delivery bowled by Pakistani cricketer Waqar Younis.

Career statistics

Club

International 

Results list South Korea's goal tally first.

Managerial statistics

Honours

Player
FC Seoul
K League 1: 2000
Korean League Cup: 2006

Sangmu FC
Korean Semi-professional League (Autumn): 1997, 1998

South Korea U20
AFC Youth Championship runner-up: 1992

South Korea
FIFA World Cup fourth place: 2002
EAFF Championship: 2003

Individual
K League Rookie of the Year: 1994
AFC Asian All Stars: 1997
Korean Semi-professional League (Autumn) top goalscorer: 1998
Korean FA Cup top goalscorer: 1999
K League 1 Most Valuable Player: 2000
K League 1 Best XI: 2000

Manager
FC Seoul
K League 1: 2012
Korean FA Cup: 2015
AFC Champions League runner-up: 2013

Jiangsu Suning
Chinese FA Cup runner-up: 2016

Individual
K League 1 Manager of the Year: 2012
AFC Coach of the Year: 2013
Korean FA Cup Best Manager: 2015

Notes

References

External links
 
 
 
 
 
 
 
 

1973 births
Living people
FC Seoul players
FC Seoul non-playing staff
FC Seoul managers
Gangwon FC managers
Gimcheon Sangmu FC players
JEF United Chiba players
Kyoto Sanga FC players
Júbilo Iwata players
J1 League players
J2 League players
K League 1 Most Valuable Player Award winners
K League 1 players
2002 CONCACAF Gold Cup players
2002 FIFA World Cup players
2001 FIFA Confederations Cup players
1998 FIFA World Cup players
Footballers at the 1996 Summer Olympics
Olympic footballers of South Korea
Association football forwards
Expatriate footballers in Japan
South Korean expatriate sportspeople in Japan
South Korean expatriate footballers
South Korea international footballers
South Korea under-23 international footballers
South Korea under-20 international footballers
South Korean footballers
South Korean football managers
K League 1 managers
Yonsei University alumni
Sportspeople from Busan
Footballers at the 1998 Asian Games
Expatriate football managers in China
Chinese Super League managers
Asian Games competitors for South Korea